Scolopendra leki is a species of centipede in the Scolopendridae family. It is endemic to Australia, and was first described in 2012.

Distribution
The species occurs in the Gibson Desert of Western Australia.

Behaviour
The centipedes are solitary terrestrial predators that inhabit plant litter, soil and rotting wood.

References

 

 
leki
Centipedes of Australia
Endemic fauna of Australia
Fauna of Western Australia
Animals described in 2012
Taxa named by Gregory Edgecombe